Marius Lindvik (born 27 June 1998) is a Norwegian ski jumper and Olympic gold medalist.

Career
He won the silver medal in the normal hill at the 2016 Winter Youth Olympics. He competed at the Junior World Championships in 2016, 2017 and 2018 with a team bronze (2018), a team silver (2016), a mixed team gold (2018) as well as the individual gold (2018).

He made his Continental Cup debut on the summer circuit in September 2015 in Oslo, recording his first podium in December 2017 in Vancouver and his first victory in January 2018 in Titisee-Neustadt. He won the winter circuit of the 2017–18 FIS Ski Jumping Continental Cup.

He made his FIS Ski Jumping World Cup debut in December 2015 in Lysgårdsbakken, recording a 32nd place, but did not have another outing before January 2018 in Zakopane where he also collected his first World Cup points with an 8th place, as well as a third place in the team competition.

He won a gold medal in the large hill competition at the 2022 Winter Olympics.

He represents the sports club Rælingen SK. He hails from Frogner i Sørum.

World Cup

Standings

Individual wins

References

External links
 
 

1998 births
Living people
People from Sørum
Norwegian male ski jumpers
Ski jumpers at the 2016 Winter Youth Olympics
Ski jumpers at the 2022 Winter Olympics
Olympic ski jumpers of Norway
Olympic gold medalists for Norway
Medalists at the 2022 Winter Olympics
Olympic medalists in ski jumping
Sportspeople from Viken (county)
21st-century Norwegian people
FIS Nordic World Ski Championships medalists in ski jumping